Dugesia sagitta is a species of dugesiid triclad that inhabits the rivers of Corfu, Greece.

In 1925 Komarek synonymized Dugesia sagitta (then Planaria sagitta) with D. gonocephala,<ref>Komárek, J., 1925. Die O. Schmidt'schen Süsswassertricladen von Corfu und Cephalonia, gesammelt von Professor Wilhelmi. Zool. Anz., 63:322-328.</ref> because the morphological description given by Schmidt when the species was named in 1861 was not accurated. In 1984 D. sagitta was back from the synonymization thanks to the contribution of a more accurated morphological description done by de Vries. In 1861 Schmidt also described D. sagitta from Cephalonia, but de Vries demonstrated that it was actually D. aenigma.

The type locality of this species is Messonghi river, Corfu, Greece.

Karyology
This Dugesia'' species, from what only sexual reproducing specimens are known, have a karyoptype of 2n=16, constituted only by acrocentric chromosomes.

References

Sagitta
Animals described in 1861
Endemic fauna of Greece
Corfu